Brotheotrachyceras is a genus of ammonite cephalopod belonging to the order Ceratitida. It was living during the Carnian age of the Late Triassic Epoch.

Classification 
The family to which Brotheotrachyceras belongs,  Trachyceratidae, has more or less involute, highly ornamented shells and ceratitic to ammonitic sutures.

References

Bibliography
 E. von Mojsisovics. 1882. Die Cephalopoden der Mediterranen Triasprovinz. Abhandlungen der Kaiserlich-Königlichen Geologischen Reichsanstalt 10:1-322
 

Trachyceratidae
Triassic ammonites
Carnian genera
Molluscs described in 1994
Prehistoric cephalopod genera
Ceratitida genera